The 2013-14 season is Duhok SC 14th consecutive season in the Iraqi Premier League.

Match Results

Iraqi Premier League

Current squad

Transfers

In

OUT

Goal scorers

References

External links
 http://www.duhoksportclub.com
 http://www.goalzz.com/main.aspx?team=1772
 http://www.flashscore.com/soccer/iraq/super-league/

Iraqi football clubs 2013–14 season
Duhoc SC seasons